Past Present may refer to:

 Pastpresent, a 1989 album by Clannad
 Past Present (John Scofield album), 2015